All Saints Church of Eben Ezer (All Saints Lutheran Church) is an historic church located in Brush, Colorado.  It was built in 1916 in an area largely settled by Lutherans of German origin.  The name of the church references Eben-Ezer, a site of numerous battles between the Israelites and Philistines.  The church was added to the National Register of Historic Places in 1982.

References

Lutheran churches in Colorado
Churches on the National Register of Historic Places in Colorado
Churches completed in 1916
Churches in Morgan County, Colorado
National Register of Historic Places in Morgan County, Colorado
1916 establishments in Colorado